Convergence is a 2019 feature film from English director Steve Johnson.

Plot
Struggling after the death of his wife and child in a car crash, successful writer Martin starts to question the circumstances of the accident after an encounter with a grieving mother at a bereavement group. Who is the mysterious character in the photographs and why can't he shake the feeling that he's being played?

Main cast
Jeremy Theobald as Martin
Nicolette McKeown as Lily
Lee Fanning as Dominic
Alfie Wellcoat as Robert
Anna Kennedy as Maggie
Jemima Spence as Christina
Marcus Macleod as The Strategist

Release and reception
The film premiered at the British Independent Film Festival on 11 May 2019 in Leicester Square, London. The film had a limited UK theatrical release in Cineworld cinemas and was given a 15 certificate by the British Board of Film Classification. The film was widely praised by critics. In the United Kingdom, UK Film Review said:

In the United States, Film Threat wrote:

Awards

References

External links
 

Scottish films
Films set in Scotland
Films shot in Scotland
2019 films
English-language Scottish films
British independent films
British drama films
2010s English-language films
2010s British films